Gustave Salgé (29 July 1878 – 30 August 1946) was a French painter. His work was part of the painting event in the art competition at the 1928 Summer Olympics.

References

External links

1878 births
1946 deaths
20th-century French painters
20th-century French male artists
French male painters
Olympic competitors in art competitions
Artists from Marseille